Catherine Coleman Flowers is an American environmental health researcher, writer and the founder of the Center for Rural Enterprise and Environmental Justice. She was selected as a MacArthur Fellow in 2020. Her first book, Waste: One Woman’s Fight Against America’s Dirty Secret, explores the environmental justice movement in rural America.

Education and early career 
Flowers grew up in Lowndes County, Alabama. Lowndes County is riddled with crumbling infrastructure, which causes sewage spills in backyards and contaminated drinking water. Flowers earned her bachelor's degree at Cameron University in 1986. She started her professional life as a geography teacher and advocate for civil rights, and was appointed as the Executive Director of the National Voting Rights Museum. As Flowers became more involved with activism, she took on different roles, including leading the NAACP Voter Empowerment Program. She eventually returned to academia, and joined the University of Nebraska at Kearney for a master's degree in history.

Career 
In 2001, Flowers moved back to Alabama, where she concentrated on economic development as part of the Lowndes County Commission. The population of Lowndes County is three-quarters Black. By 2002, she had identified several failings of the local sanitation; including people being arrested for not paying for on-site septic systems and people who were paying for on-site sanitation not being provided adequate provisions. Flowers was surprised that the government was targeting the poorest members of society rather than the much wealthier corporate polluters. This experience motivated her to focus on environmental justice and climate. She received federal approval from the United States Environmental Protection Agency (EPA) to produce a plan to address raw sewage in Lowndes County.

In 2011, Flowers worked with a UN Special Rapporteur to better understand poverty and its impacts on infrastructure in Lowndes County, Alabama. Since 2015 Flowers has held a position as Senior Fellow at the Center for Earth Ethics. She spent 2017 as a Franklin Humanities Institute Practitioner in Residence at Duke University. She founded the Center for Rural Enterprise and Environmental Justice in 2019.

Flowers and the Columbia Law School Human Rights Institute investigated how structural inequalities impact access to sanitation and clean water. She identified that marginalised, poverty-stricken rural communities were more likely to suffer from contaminated water and poor sanitation. Together, these permit the spread of intestinal parasitic infections, including hookworm. In 2019, JoAnn Kamuf Ward and Flowers published, Flushed and Forgotten: Sanitation and Wastewater in Rural Communities in the United States, in which Flowers wrote, “In Lowndes County, Alabama, and many of the surrounding areas, lack of basic amenities that many Americans take for granted is a way of life,”. The report made a series of recommendations, including taking steps to improve accountability, ensuring participation of affected communities in any decision-making, and ensuring access to adequate sanitation on the basis of equality.

In 2019, she delivered expert testimony to the United States Congress in which she urged the government to address the diseases associated with poverty in the United States. She was appointed to the Joe Biden Task Force on Climate Change, which is co-chaired by Alexandria Ocasio-Cortez. Flowers is the only Black member of the task force. In 2021 she was appointed a member of the White House Environmental Justice Advisory Council.

Awards and honors 

 2004 Interreligious and International Peace Council's Crown of Peace Award for Exemplary Leadership in Reconciliation and Peacemaking
 2016 Grist 50
 2017 Women Who Shape the State
 2020 River Rally River Hero
 2020 The Jean and Leslie Douglas Pearl Award
 2020 Studs and Ida Terkel Prize
 2020 Greenmatters Black Climate Scientists and Scholars Changing the World
 2020 Selected as a MacArthur Fellow

Selected publications

References 

Environmental health practitioners
African-American women academics
African-American academics
American women academics
Living people
Year of birth missing (living people)
People from Lowndes County, Alabama
Cameron University alumni
University of Nebraska at Kearney alumni
MacArthur Fellows
21st-century African-American people
21st-century African-American women